Zuiderwijk is a Dutch surname. Notable people with the surname include:

Cesar Zuiderwijk (born 1948), Dutch drummer
Martine Zuiderwijk (born 1984), Dutch figure skater

Dutch-language surnames